4P, 4-P or 4.P may refer to:

Arts and entertainment 
 Danzig 4p, a 1994 heavy metal album
4P, the production code for the 1976 Doctor Who serial The Deadly Assassin

Business 
 The 4 P's or marketing mix, a tool used in marketing products

Government and politics of the Philippines 
Pantawid Pamilyang Pilipino Program
4Ps Party-list, a political party

Science 
 4P/Faye, a periodic comet in the Solar System
4p, one of human chromosome 4's two arms

See also
 P4 (disambiguation)